Ronny Nilsen (born 7 May 1971 in Åsane, Bergen) is a former Norwegian track and field athlete who competed in the javelin. He represented the Hordaland club IL Norna-Salhus. He was a policeman in Oslo for many years, but since 1 September 2008 he is the head of sport of Norges Friidrettsforbund.

He took part in the 2004 Olympics in Athens, 2005 World Championships in Helsinki and the 2006 European Athletics Championships in Gothenburg, but failed to get past the qualification rounds.

He competed for the club IL Norna-Salhus.

Nilsen is a graduate of the Norwegian Police University College, and for many years worked at the Sentrum politistasjon in Oslo. After a period as senior advisor at NAV, he found a job as the head of sport at Norges Friidrettsforbund.

Achievements

Medals at Norwegian championship
Nilsen has nine national medals in javelin, including two national titles.

References

Norwegian male javelin throwers
Norwegian police officers
1971 births
Sportspeople from Bergen
Living people